Brooks Seaplane Base  is a city-owned, public-use seaplane base located in the city of Coeur d'Alene, Kootenai County, Idaho, United States. It is located on Lake Coeur d'Alene.

Facilities and aircraft 
Brooks Seaplane Base has two landing areas designated 11/29 and 15/33, each measuring 15,000 x 2,000 feet (4,572 x 610 m). For the 12-month period ending September 27, 2006, the airport had 2,900 aircraft operations, an average of 242 per month: 59% general aviation and 41% air taxi.

Accidents and Incidents 
On July 5, 2020, two aircraft, a Cessna 206 and a de Havilland Canada DHC-2 Beaver collided over Lake Coeur d'Alene killing all eight aboard both planes. The de Havilland floatplane had originated from Brooks Seaplane Base and was carrying 48-year old professional golfer Sean Fredrickson and his three children on a seaplane tour. Fredrickson served as the president of the Pacific Northwest PGA Section.

References

External links 
Brooks Seaplane Base (S76) at Idaho Transportation Department

Airports in Idaho
Seaplane bases in the United States
Buildings and structures in Coeur d'Alene, Idaho
Transportation in Kootenai County, Idaho